Pure Grass Films is a British independent production company that specialises in digital entertainment series, feature films and television series.

History 
Pure Grass Films was co-founded by Managing Director Ben Grass and Creative Director Tom Grass in May 2005. The company specialises in digital entertainment series, feature films and television series.

On March 18, 2008, Endemol UK, now Endemol Shine UK announced its acquisition of a 40% stake in Pure Grass Films. Endemol UK's Chief Executive Tim Hincks commented that: "our digital strategy is simple – we want to work with creative people who have brilliant ideas. Ben and Tom fit the bill perfectly."

Current Productions 
Pure Grass is currently producing Twist, a 3D contemporary retelling of Oliver Twist shot in London. Raff Law was cast to play the titular Oliver. Lena Headey was cast as Sikes and Rita Ora as Dodge. Michael Caine was cast as Fagin. David Walliams was cast as Losberne, Noel Clarke as Brownlow, Jason Maza as Bedwin, Franz Drameh as Batesy and Sophie Simnett as Red. The film is scheduled for release in late 2020. Sky Cinema will distribute the film within the United Kingdom, with Saban Films distributing within North America.

Board & Advisors 
Pure Grass' Advisors include British Actor Damian Lewis, whose credits include Band of Brothers and Homeland (TV series); Roger Vakharia, Director, Media & Entertainment at Google Cloud; David Chermont – veteran media sales specialist & founder of INBOUND CAPITAL; Erica Motley – a former SVP of acquisitions at UIP and Sonar and Ernesto Schmitt - a German-Uruguayan tech & media entrepreneur. The Chairman of the Board is Christophe Charlier, the former Chairman of Renaissance Capital and the Brooklyn Nets NBA Basketball team.

Credits 
Prior credits include Kirill starring David Schofield, which won a Webby and was nominated for a Digital Emmy, and Beyond the Rave – MySpace's first international production.  Beyond the Rave was a 20 part Horror series financed by Hammer Films – their first production in 25 years. It starred Jamie Dornan (Fifty Shades of Grey), Sadie Frost (Dracula), Nora-Jane Noone (The Descent) and Tamer Hassan (Eastern Promises). Music was by Pete Tong. On 17 April 2008, the series was first released through MySpace TV, as their first international co-production, followed by a major international DVD release.

Other credits include When Evil Calls – the world's first horror series for mobile phones, starring Sean Pertwee (Dog Soldiers), Dominique Pinon (Amelie, Delicatessen), and Chris Barrie (Red Dwarf).

Full Credits list 

 When Evil Calls - Won the 2006 Telemedia Eureka Awards in Amsterdam, and has been nominated as a finalist in the Broadcast Awards in the category of Best Use of Mobile TV.
 Beyond the Rave
 Kirill - Won a 2009 Webby for Best Drama Episode, and was also nominated for a Digital Emmy.
 The Cell 2
 Trigger Point - Commissioned by ITV
 Twist (Upcoming 2020) - Contemporary remake of Oliver Twist featuring Rafferty Law, Rita Ora and Michael Caine.

References 

Film production companies of the United Kingdom
Television production companies of the United Kingdom